Katherine Bergeron (born 1958) is an American academic administrator who serves as the 11th President of Connecticut College in New London, Connecticut. Selected by the College's Board of Trustees in August 2013, she took office on January 1, 2014.

Early life and education
Bergeron was born in New London, Connecticut in 1958. She earned a bachelor of arts degree in music from Wesleyan University and master and doctoral degrees in music from Cornell University.

Career 
As a musician and a historian, Bergeron's scholarship has focused on French music and culture of the late 19th and early 20th centuries. She is a two-time recipient of the American Society of Composers, Authors, and Publisher' Deems-Taylor Award for her books Decadent Enchantments (University of California Press, 1998) and Voice Lessons (Oxford University Press, 2010). Voice Lessons also received the Otto Kinkeldey Award from the American Musicological Society.

Bergeron has held professorships at the University of North Carolina at Chapel Hill, Tufts University, University of California at Berkeley, and at Brown University, where she also served as dean of the college from 2006 to 2013.

On August 20, 2013, the Connecticut College Board of Trustees elected Bergeron as the 11th president of Connecticut College. Bergeron took office on January 1, 2014.

President of Connecticut College 
Bergeron has supported overhauling the Connecticut College curriculum. During her tenure, Connecticut College received the largest gift in its history to support financial aid, career education, and athletics. The College also completed a $10 million renovation of the Charles E. Shain Library that transformed the mid-century facility into a more modern space. The library has received several design awards for its architecture.

Fundraising Event Controversy and Community Unrest 

Bergeron was the subject of controversy in early 2023 after she reportedly scheduled a Connecticut College fundraising event at the allegedly racist and antisemitic Everglades Club in Palm Beach, Florida, despite the urging of the college's Dean of Institutional Equity and Inclusion, Rodmon King. This was listed as one of the key factors that led to his resignation. On February 27, 2023, students began an occupation of Fanning Hall in protest, which lasted ten days. A new student organization, Student Voices for Equity composed a list of student demands in response to Dean King's resignation and the long-standing pattern of inequity under Bergeron's leadership. Faculty also signaled their solidarity, authoring a set of expectations that overlapped with those of the students. Student demands included the following: 

 The resignation of Connecticut College President, Katherine Bergeron.
 Conduct a transparent Presidential search immediately, along with the restructuring of the review and appointment process for Presidents.
 Strengthen DIEI by guaranteeing salaried pay for all full-time professional staffers and increasing its staffing/programming budget to competitively hire and compensate additional qualified personnel, prioritizing transparency and the implementation of effective institutional spending reviews.
 Immediate prioritization of hiring more BIPOC faculty and staff throughout all offices with the inclusion of mandatory DIEI sensitivity, mediation, and equity training.
 Establish greater and distinct resources for BIPOC, LGBTQIA+, undocumented, international, first-gen, Disabled, and low-income students. 
 DIEI offices and affiliated identity-based spaces should be ADA-accessible and fully equipped to support the populations they serve.
 The maintenance of a consistent curriculum and retention of the courses necessary to complete an education within Africana Studies, East Asian Studies, Hispanic Studies, Global Islamic Studies, Jewish Studies, and Arabic Studies.
 The implementation of SVE as a lasting body composed of student representatives in communication with administration and the Board of Trustees to ensure the implementation of current and future institutional equity and inclusion needs.

The protest marked the fourth occupation of the administrative building Fanning Hall, in Connecticut College history, and the second during Bergeron's presidency. In May of 2016, student occupiers moved into Fanning Hall to demand accountability from the Connecticut College administration regarding its handling of alleged bias incidents. According to the Fanning Takeover Facebook, the student demands in 2016 were as follows: 1.) clarification on which bias incidents warrant all-campus emails and which don’t, 2.) an affirmation of the College’s commitment to the student bill of rights which says we have a right to free inquiry.

Personal life 
Bergeron is married to Joseph Butch Rovan, a composer and multimedia artist who is professor of music at Brown University and former director of the Brown Arts Institute.

Published works 
A selection of Bergeron's publications include:
 Bergeron, K. (1992). Disciplining Music: Musicology and Its Canons, ed., Katherine Bergeron and Philip Bohlman. Chicago: University of Chicago Press
 Bergeron, K. (1998). Decadent Enchantments: The Revival of Gregorian Chant at Solesmes. Berkeley: University of California Press
 Bergeron, K. (2004). Music, Rhythm, Language. Special Issue of Representations, ed. Katherine Bergeron vol. 86 (Spring)
 Bergeron, K. (2010). Voice Lessons: French Mélodie in the Belle Epoque. New York: Oxford University Press
 Bergeron, K. (2011). The Free Elective Curriculum. Piotr Wilczek and Mark O’Connor, eds., Collegium/ College/ Kolegium: College and the Academic Community in the European and the American Tradition. Uniwersytet Warszawski.
 Bergeron, K. (2012) A Tradition of Reform: The Curriculum at Brown University. Paul Blackmore and Camille Kandiko, eds., Strategic Curriculum Change in Universities: Global Trends. London: Routledge
 Bergeron, K. (2014). Listening to Write. Christiane Donahue, ed. The Power of Writing. Hanover, New Hampshire: University Press of New England

References

External links
 Katherine Bergeron, President of Connecticut College

Cornell University alumni
Connecticut College
American women musicologists
American musicologists
Wesleyan College alumni
Heads of universities and colleges in the United States
Living people
Women heads of universities and colleges
1958 births
21st-century American women
People from New London, Connecticut